Jonas Pipynė (30 November 1935 in Biržai – 23 September 1997 in Vilnius) was a Lithuanian track and field runner and skier.

In 1957, he was named the Lithuanian Sportsman of the Year. In 1954 Pipynė won gold medal in national cross country skiing championships. Sixteen times he won gold medals in Lithuanian Athletics Championships. He reached national Lithuanian running records 32 times in 1500 m, 800 m, 1000 m, 2000 m, 5000 m, mile, 4x800, 4x1500, 4x400 events and four times achieved Soviet Union record in 1500 m run. 4 times in a row 1956–1959 became Soviet Union champion. Pipynė represented Soviet Union in the 1956 Summer Olympics.

Personal bests

References 

1935 births
1997 deaths
Athletes (track and field) at the 1956 Summer Olympics
Lithuanian male middle-distance runners
Lithuanian male cross-country skiers
Lithuanian Sportsperson of the Year winners
Olympic athletes of the Soviet Union
Soviet male middle-distance runners
People from Biržai